Edward Van Sloan (born Edward Paul Van Sloun; November 1, 1882 – March 6, 1964) was an American character actor best remembered for his roles in the Universal Studios horror films such as Dracula (1931), Frankenstein (1931), and The Mummy (1932).

Early years 
Edward Paul Van Sloun was of Dutch and German descent and was born in New Trier, Minnesota, on November 1, 1882 the son of Martinus Van Sloun and Theresa ( Breher) Van Sloun. He was living in San Francisco by 1900 with his aunt Mary (née Breher) Baumann and her daughter Alma. His mother settled in San Francisco, where young Edward resided with his siblings (the artist Frank J., Mary D., Leonora M., Alma K., Josephine) and mother as he launched his acting career in theaters.

Career
In 1915, Van Sloan was the leading man with the Forsberg Players, based at the Fulton Opera House in  Lancaster, Pennsylvania.

Van Sloan's roles in Universal's films date from the 1930s, including Dracula (1931), Frankenstein (1931), and The Mummy (1932). In the first of these, he played Professor Van Helsing, the famous vampire-hunter, a role he had first taken in the successful touring production of Dracula by Hamilton Deane and John L. Balderston. He played essentially the same role, this time as Dr. Muller, an occultist, in The Mummy. He again played Van Helsing in the 1936 film Dracula's Daughter. In Frankenstein, he played the character of Dr. Waldman, and he also stepped in front of a curtain before the film's opening credits to warn audience members that they now had a chance to escape the theatre if they were too squeamish to endure the film.

On Broadway, Van Sloan's credits included The Vigil (1948), Remote Control (1929), Dracula (1927), Lost (1927), Juarez and Maximilian (1926), Schweiger (1926), Morals (1925), Polly Preferred (1923), and The Unknown Purple (1919).

Personal life
In 1910, Van Sloan acted in Pinero, in Montreal, Canada, where he married the leading lady Myra Jackson, with whom he had one child, Paul (born February 21, 1911, in Pennsylvania). During the 1920s, Van Sloan appeared in several plays at the 48th Street Theater on Broadway, including the 1924 stage adaptation of Dracula before accepting an offer in late 1930 (at age 48) for a part in the acclaimed Tod Browning-directed screen production of Dracula. He died in 1964 at age 81.

Filmography

 Slander (1916) – Joseph Tremaine (film debut)
 Dracula (1931) – Professor Van Helsing
 Frankenstein (1931) – Dr. Waldman
 Under Eighteen (1931) – Assistant to François (uncredited)
 Manhattan Parade (1931) – The Lawyer (uncredited)
 Behind the Mask (1932) – Dr. August Steiner
 Play Girl (1932) – Moffatt, the Boss
 Man Wanted (1932) – Mr. Walters
 Forgotten Commandments (1932) – Doctor (uncredited)
 Thunder Below (1932) – Doctor (uncredited)
 The Last Mile (1932) – Rabbi
 The Death Kiss (1932) – Tom Avery
 The Mummy (1932) – Dr. Muller
 The Billion Dollar Scandal (1933) – Attorney Carp
 Infernal Machine (1933) – Professor Gustabve Hoffman
 The World Gone Mad (1933) – (uncredited)
 The Working Man (1933) – Mr. Briggs
 Trick for Trick (1933) – John Russell
 The Silk Express (1933) – Mill Owner in Association (uncredited)
 It's Great to Be Alive (1933) – Dr. Wilton
 Baby Face (1933) – Jameson – Bank Director (uncredited)
 Deluge (1933) – Professor Carlysle
 Murder on the Campus (1933) – Prof. C. Edson Hawley
 Goodbye Love (1933) – Judge
 Blood Money (1933) – Jordan - Department Store Manager (uncredited)
 The Crosby Case (1934) – Professor Franz Lubeck
 Manhattan Melodrama (1934) – Yacht Capt. Swenson (uncredited)
 The Scarlet Empress (1934) – Herr Wagner (uncredited)
 The Life of Vergie Winters (1934) – Jim Winters
 I'll Fix It (1934) – Parkes
 Mills of the Gods (1934) – Komeoski
 The Man Who Reclaimed His Head (1934) – Board Director (uncredited)
 Grand Old Girl (1935) – Holland
 A Shot in the Dark (1935) – Prof. Bostwick
 The Woman in Red (1935) – Foxall - Prosecuting Attorney
 Death Flies East (1935) – Dr. O'Neill (uncredited)
 Captain Hurricane (1935) – Man at Susan Ann's Bedside (uncredited)
 Air Hawks (1935) – Prof. Schulter
 The Arizonian (1935) – Judge Cody (uncredited)
 The Black Room (1935) – Doctor (uncredited)
 The Last Days of Pompeii (1935) – Calvus
 Three Kids and a Queen (1935) – Dr. Gordon
 Grand Exit (1935) – Klorer (uncredited)
 The Story of Louis Pasteur (1936) – Chairman at Medical Society (uncredited)
 Road Gang (1936) – Mr. Dudley
 Dracula's Daughter (1936) – Professor Von Helsing (sic) 
 Fatal Lady (1936) – French Surete (uncredited)
 Sins of Man (1936) – Austrian Army Doctor
 The Man Who Found Himself (1937) – Medical Board Doctor (uncredited)
 The Road Back (1937) – President (uncredited)
 Souls at Sea (1937) – Ship's Officer (uncredited)
 Penitentiary (1938) – Dr. Rinewulf (uncredited)
 The Toy Wife (1938) – Older Man (uncredited)
 Danger on the Air (1938) – Dr. Leonard Sylvester
 Campus Confessions (1938) – Professor (uncredited)
 Storm Over Bengal (1938) – Maharajah of Lhanapur
 The Phantom Creeps (1939, Serial) – Jarvis [Chs. 2-12]
 Honeymoon in Bali (1939) – Priest on Bali (uncredited)
 Abe Lincoln in Illinois (1940) – Dr. Barrett (uncredited)
 Teddy, the Rough Rider (1940, Short) – Elihu Root (uncredited)
 The Doctor Takes a Wife (1940) – Burkhardt
The Secret Seven (1940) – Prof. Holtz
 Before I Hang (1940) – Dr. Ralph Howard
 Virginia (1941) – Minister (uncredited)
 The Monster and the Girl (1941) – Dave – the Warden (uncredited)
 Love Crazy (1941) – Sanity Hearing Doctor (uncredited)
 The Men in Her Life (1941) – First Doctor (uncredited)
 A Man's World (1942) – Doc Stone
 Destination Unknown (1942) – Holland Legation (uncredited)
 Valley of Hunted Men (1942) – Dr. Heinrich Steiner
 Hitler's Children (1943) – Chief Tribunal Judge (uncredited)
 Submarine Alert (1943) – Dr. Johann Bergstrom (uncredited)
 Mission to Moscow (1943) – German Diplomat in Berlin (uncredited)
 Riders of the Rio Grande (1943, Serial) – Pop Owens
 The Masked Marvel (1943, Serial) – Prof. A.M. MacRae (uncredited)
 The Song of Bernadette (1943) – Doctor (uncredited)
 Captain America (1944) – Gregory-Lyman's Aide [Chs. 1-2] (uncredited)
 Wing and a Prayer (1944) – Admiral (uncredited)
 The Conspirators (1944) – Dutch Underground Leader (uncredited)
 End of the Road (1944) – Judge
 I'll Remember April (1945) – Board Member (uncredited)
 The Mask of Diijon (1946) – Sheffield
 Betty Co-Ed (1946) – A.J.A. Woodruff
 A Foreign Affair (1948) – German (uncredited)
 Sealed Verdict (1948) – Priest
 This Side of the Law (1950) – Judge (uncredited)
 The Underworld Story (1950) – Minister at Funeral (uncredited; final film role)

References

External links

 
 
 

1882 births
1964 deaths
American male film actors
American male stage actors
Male actors from Minnesota
American people of Dutch descent
American people of German descent
20th-century American male actors